Oung Ouen is a Cambodian politician and former governor of Banteay Meanchey province, Cambodia.

In 2008 he expressed concerns about Thai deployments along 150 kilometers of his border, west of Preah Vihear Temple, the initial site of a military standoff that began on July 15.

References

Cambodian politicians
Living people
Year of birth missing (living people)